Huntsville State Park is a  wooded recreational area, six miles (10 km) southwest of Huntsville, Texas, within Walker County and the Sam Houston National Forest.

History 
In the early 1930s, at a meeting of the Huntsville-Walker County Chamber of Commerce, it was suggested that a park be built around Huntsville. The Chamber of Commerce took the proposal to the Texas State Parks Board. The board required that the community provide
the land for the park. Twenty thousand dollars in bonds would have to be sold by Walker County to pay for the land needed. In early
1936, the bond issue passed with more than four to one in favor of selling the bonds.

From 1937 to 1942, Civilian Conservation Corps (CCC) Company 1823(CV), an experienced company of African American World War I veterans, made initial improvements to the site, including construction of the combination building, the boat house, and the dam and spillway creating Lake Raven. The company also had to clear the future lake bed of standing timber before filling the lake. Other CCC projects in the park included a swimming platform, stone culverts, picnic areas, Lakeshore Road, a bridge, stone road-curbing, a well, water intake structure, and frame pump house. The spillway gave way after a 1940 flood and Lake Raven drained. This scuttled plans to build a bath house and cabins.

CCC Companies 873 and 1827 were assigned to the area between 1933 and 1937 for firefighting and flood control. They also built unpaved roads within the park, which have mostly grown over.

With the start of World War II, the CCC's work ended, but Works Progress Administration workers and prison laborers completed projects that included building roads and water and septic systems, allowing limited use of the park in summer months during the war.

A private contractor began repairs on the dam in 1955 and it was completed in April, 1956. The Huntsville-Walker County Chamber of Commerce dedicated and opened Huntsville State Park to the public on Friday, May 18, 1956.

Nature
The park is dominated by loblolly pine and shortleaf pine trees. White-tailed deer, raccoons, opossums, armadillos,  and fox squirrels live in the park. 218 species of birds have been documented either on the ground or flying over the park. Lake Raven has crappie, bluegill, catfish and bass. Occasionally alligators have been spotted in the lake.

Notes

External links

 Texas Parks and Wildlife Park Page
1969 home movie of Huntsville State Park from the Coltman Collection on the Texas Archive of the Moving Image

State parks of Texas
Protected areas of Walker County, Texas